E:60 is an American sports newsmagazine broadcast by ESPN. The series features investigative journalism, focusing upon news, issues, and other stories in sports.

In January 2017, it was announced that E:60, after having had no consistent timeslot since its October 2007 debut, would be re-launched as a live, Sunday-morning program hosted by Bob Ley and Jeremy Schaap, beginning on May 14, 2017. It replaced The Sports Reporters and the Sunday edition of Ley's fellow program Outside the Lines. The revamped program shares a new studio with Outside the Lines, and features contributions from its staff.

Accolades

Emmy Awards

Edward R. Murrow Awards 

In addition, E:60 also has the following accolades:
 8 National Headliner Awards
 38 New York Festivals Awards 
 5 NAMIC Awards
 5 NABJ Awards
 2 Gracie Awards
 2 Eclipse Awards
 1 Robert F. Kennedy Journalism Award
 1 Peabody Award for "Spartan Silence: Crisis at Michigan State"

See also
Real Sports with Bryant Gumbel
60 Minutes Sports

References

External links
 

ESPN original programming
2007 American television series debuts
2010s American television series
American sports television series
Television Academy Honors winners